Sprung is a 1997 comedy film written by Rusty Cundieff and Darin Scott, directed by Cundieff and starring Tisha Campbell, Cundieff, Paula Jai Parker and Joe Torry.

Plot 
In 1990s Pittsburgh, Montel (Rusty Cundieff) and Clyde (Joe Torry) are friends who could not be less alike. An introverted photographer, Montel wants to meet the one right girl for him and settle down to build a family, while Clyde is a flamboyant womanizer just out for a good time.

At a party, they meet Adina (Paula Jai Parker), a sexy golddigger seeking a wealthy husband with robotic determination, and her shy law clerk friend Brandy (Tisha Campbell). The couples pair off in predictable combinations, but while the brief encounter between Clyde and Adina quickly implodes when she discovers that Clyde's success is an act and his Porsche is borrowed, the relationship between Montel and Brandy blooms into a true romance. Eventually, they decide to move in together, motivating Clyde and Adina to reunite in a selfish scheme to break their best friends up, using whatever treacherous means they can employ.

Cast 
 Tisha Campbell as Brandy 
 Rusty Cundieff as Montel 
 Paula Jai Parker as Adina 
 Joe Torry as Clyde 
 Moon Jones as Godzilla Nuts Suspect 
 Bobby Mardis as Foreign Suspect 
 John Witherspoon as Detective 
 Jennifer Lee as Veronica 
 Clarence Williams III as Grand Daddy 
 Loretta Jean as Bride's Mother 
 Ronnie Willis as Party Guard 
 John Ganun as Patrol Officer #1 
 David McKnight as Patrol Officer #2 
 Ron Brooks as Watch Commander
 Nick LaTour as Dancing Older Man
 Darin Scott as Inconsiderate Husband
 Isabel Sanford as Sista #1
 Angela Means as Sista #2
 Yolanda "Yo-Yo" Whitaker as Sista #3
 Homeselle Joy as Sista #4 (as Homselle Joy)
 Sherman Hemsley as Brotha #1
 Reynaldo Rey as Brotha #2
 Mark Christopher Lawrence as Brotha #3
 Tim Hutchinson as Brotha #4
 Freda Payne as Vocalist

Soundtrack

Reception 

The film received a 20% rating on Rotten Tomatoes from 10 reviews.

References

External links 
 
 

1997 films
1997 romantic comedy films
American romantic comedy films
Films scored by Stanley Clarke
Films directed by Rusty Cundieff
Films set in the 1990s
Films set in Pittsburgh
Trimark Pictures films
1990s English-language films
1990s American films